Peter G. Strasser is an American attorney who served as the United States Attorney for the Eastern District of Louisiana from 2018 to 2021. Prior to becoming the U.S. Attorney, he was a partner at the New Orleans office of Chaffe McCalle.

Biography

Strasser earned his Bachelor of Arts, with distinction, from the University of Virginia. He earned his Juris Doctor from Washington and Lee University School of Law.

Strasser previously served as an Assistant United States Attorney for the Eastern District of Louisiana, where he was the head of the organized crime and the economic crime sections. He also served for over eleven years at United States Embassies in Eastern Europe, Asia, and Africa as a Resident Legal Advisor with the Department of Justice's Office of Overseas Prosecutorial Development, Assistance, and Training.

He is a retired Navy Reserve Captain, JAGC, where he served world-wide as a military judge.

U.S. Attorney

On June 20, 2018, President Donald Trump announced his intent to nominate Strasser to be the next United States Attorney for the Eastern District of Louisiana. On June 25, 2018, his nomination was sent to the United States Senate. On August 23, 2018, his nomination was reported out of committee by a voice vote. On August 28, 2018, the United States Senate confirmed his nomination by voice vote. Strasser was sworn into office on September 10, 2018.

On February 8, 2021, he along with 55 other Trump-era attorneys were asked to resign. On February 23, 2021, Strasser submitted his resignation, effective February 28, 2021.

References

External links
 Biography at Department of Justice

Living people
21st-century American lawyers
Assistant United States Attorneys
United States Navy Judge Advocate General's Corps
United States Attorneys for the Eastern District of Louisiana
University of Virginia alumni
Virginia lawyers
Washington and Lee University School of Law alumni
Year of birth missing (living people)